Karin Schaupp (born 1972) is a German-born Australian classical guitarist. She has won APRA Music Awards and ARIA Music Awards.

Early life
Karin Schaupp was born in Hofheim am Taunus, Germany, in 1972. Her mother, Isolde Schaupp, was a teacher of guitar at the conservatorium of Wiesbaden. Her father, a doctor, was an amateur pianist, and her aunt and grandmother were opera singers. Karin was given a half-size guitar by her grandmother when she was aged three. She started her guitar studies with her mother when she was five, and performed in public at age six. Her family, including both sets of grandparents, migrated from Germany to Australia when she was aged eight, and they have been based in Brisbane, Queensland, where Isolde Schaupp continues to teach at the University of Queensland and the University of Southern Queensland. Karen was dux of Clayfield College and she completed her tertiary education with bachelor's and master's degrees in music at the University of Queensland. Schaupp also trained at the National Institute of Dramatic Art (NIDA).

Career
While in her teens, Karin Schaupp won prizes at competitions at Lagonegro in Italy and Madrid in Spain. At the Madrid competition she won the special competition prize for the Best Interpretation of Spanish Music. She performed Joaquín Rodrigo's Concierto de Aranjuez with the Queensland Philharmonic Orchestra when she was aged 18.

She is a member of Saffire, also known as the Australian Guitar Quartet, along with Slava Grigoryan, Gareth Koch, and Anthony Field (replaced by Leonard Grigoryan).

In 1995, Schaupp performed Philip Bračanin's Guitar Concerto, which she had premiered in 1992, with the Queensland Symphony Orchestra. The recording won an APRA Award at the APRA Awards of 1995.

Schaupp's solo debut album, Soliloquy, released in 1997, was praised by UK Classical Guitar Magazine as "a pace-setting performance in all respects".

In 2003 Schaupp was awarded the Music Council of Australia Freedman Fellowship in recognition of her achievements.

In 2004, Schaupp performed with Ross Edwards' Concerto for Guitar and Strings with the Tasmanian Symphony Orchestra.

In 2007, David Williamson wrote the one-woman play Lotte's Gift for her; it is based on her own life and that of her mother and grandmother (the Lotte of the title). The performance includes both acting and playing the guitar and is regularly toured by Schaupp. Schaupp says she was initially nervous about airing the family history. "I took quite a bit of convincing, but David made me realise if we were going to tell the story, we had to tell the whole story. There are many layers: a love story, a war story, a musical story." Williamson said that despite Lotte's thwarted ambition, her story was a happy one. "One of the terrific things is that Karin's grandmother's need to perform has finally come out." Schaupp starred in some 150 performances of Lotte's Gift, including a four-week season at the Edinburgh Festival Fringe in 2009.

Schaupp released Spain in 2009 which features works by Rodrigo, Salvador Bacarisse and Mario Castelnuovo-Tedesco. It was recorded with the Tasmanian Symphony Orchestra and the choir Cantillation.

In 2010, Schaupp recorded Cradle Songs, inspired by the birth of her daughter Alexa.

In 2013, Schaupp won the Music Fellowship from the Australia Council for the Arts.

In 2016, she and actor Tama Matheson co-created the theatre work titled Don Juan, based on Lord Byron's poem.

In March 2018, ABC Classics released Schaupp's album titled Wayfaring, with cellist Umberto Clerici.

Schaupp performed at the 2018 Commonwealth Games Closing Ceremony.

Personal life
She is married to Giac Giacomantonio, a psychologist and former guitar student of her mother Isolde. They have two daughters.

Discography

Awards

APRA Awards
The APRA Awards are held in Australia and New Zealand by the Australasian Performing Right Association to recognise songwriting skills, sales and airplay performance by its members annually. Schaupp has won two awards.

|-
| 1995
| "Concerto for Guitar and Chamber Orchestra" 
| Most Performed Contemporary Classical Compesition
| 
|-
| 2005
| "Concerto for Guitar and Strings" 
| Orchestral Work of the Year
| 
|-

ARIA Music Awards
The ARIA Music Awards is an annual awards ceremony that recognises excellence, innovation, and achievement across all genres of Australian music. Schaupp has won 1 award from 5 nominations.

|-
| 1998
| Leyenda
| Best Classical Album
| 
|-
| 2011
| Fandango 
| Best Classical Album
| 
|-
| rowspan="2"| 2012
| rowspan="2"| Songs of the Southern Skies 
| Best Adult Contemporary Album
| 
|-
| Best Independent Release
| 
|-
| 2017
| Songs of the Latin Skies 
| Best World Music Album
| 
|-

References

External links 
 
 Karin Schaupp on Discogs
 Karin Schaupp on WhoSampled

Living people
1972 births
APRA Award winners
German emigrants to Australia
Australian classical guitarists
Australian women guitarists
People from Brisbane
University of Queensland alumni
National Institute of Dramatic Art alumni
People educated at Clayfield College
People from Main-Taunus-Kreis
Women classical guitarists
21st-century guitarists
21st-century women guitarists